Klosterstræde 16 is a four-storey building in the Old Town of Copenhagen, Denmark. It was listed in the Danish registry of protected buildings and places in 1992.

History
Klosterstræde was built as a two-storey building sometime between 1731 and 1734 for shoemaker Marquar Feltman. It was between 1778 and 1793 heightened by two storeys for glovemaker Søren Jørgensen Lund.

The building was listed in 1992.

Todau
Co'libri, a bookbindery, is based in the basement.

Cultural references
In Katrine Engberg's 2016 crime novel The Tenant, the first book in her Copenhagen series, a young woman is discovered brutally murdered in one of the apartments at Klosterstræde 16.

References

External links
 Klosterstræde at indenforvoldene.dk
 Co'libri

Listed residential buildings in Copenhagen